Orsolya Nagy (born 17 November 1977) is a Hungarian fencer who competed in the women's individual sabre events at the 2004 and 2008 Summer Olympics. She won a bronze medal in the individual sabre event at the 2009 World Fencing Championships.

References

1977 births
Living people
Hungarian female sabre fencers
Olympic fencers of Hungary
Fencers at the 2004 Summer Olympics
Fencers at the 2008 Summer Olympics
Fencers from Budapest
21st-century Hungarian women